Searcy Public Schools  is a school district in Searcy, White County, Arkansas, United States, which was established in 1870.

It serves most of Searcy and Higginson.

Schools 
 Secondary schools
 Searcy High School, serving grades 9 through 12.
 James W. Ahlf Junior High School, serving grades 7 and 8.

 Ełementary schools
 Southwest Middle School, serving grades 4, 5 and 6.
 McRae Elementary School, serving kindergarten through grade 3.
 Sidney Elementary School, serving kindergarten through grade 3. 
 Westside Elementary School, serving kindergarten through grade 3.

References

External links
 
 
Education in White County, Arkansas
School districts established in 1870
School districts in Arkansas
Searcy, Arkansas
1870 establishments in Arkansas